Victoria Bush (born 15 January 1978) is a British actress and comedian. She is best known for portraying the roles of Tina O'Kane in the ITV prison drama series Bad Girls (2001–2006), and Sonya Donnegan in the BBC One school-based drama series Waterloo Road (2012–2015).

Career
Bush trained at the Mountview Academy of Theatre Arts, one of Britain's leading drama schools.

On leaving drama school, she secured her first major television role on the highly acclaimed ITV prison drama Bad Girls in 2001 as Tina Purvis (later Julie O'Kane, then Tina O'Kane) during the shows' third series. Bush continued in the role for a further five series until the shows axe in 2006.

Bush is currently one half of female comedy duo of Checkley & Bush with Laura Checkley. Recent tours include "Keep Calm and Carry On", which featured at the Edinburgh Fringe Festival in 2011, which included cameos from Abbey Merritt and Vev Gaunt.

In 2012, Bush joined the cast of the successful BBC school drama Waterloo Road as new school secretary Sonya Donnegan. She continued in the role for a further three series until the shows initial cancellation in 2015.

In 2015, she guest-starred in the BBC hospital drama Casualty as Florence Lale, and in 2016 the ITV soap opera Coronation Street as Vanessa. The following year, she played the part of Kitty Birch in BBC's Doctors.

Filmography

Film

Television

References

External links
 

1978 births
Living people
English television actresses
English comedians
People from King's Lynn
21st-century English actresses